Events from the year 1854 in Sweden

Incumbents
 Monarch – Oscar I

Events

 The Telegraph connection is established between Stockholm and Gothenburg.
 The first Train station.
 The free church of Anna Johansdotter Norbäck is separated from the state church.
 Founding of the Fruntimmersällskapet för fångars förbättring.
 November - Muteupproret.

Births

 12 January - Hugo Birger, painter (died 1887) 
 3 September – Anna Sandström, reform educator  (died 1931)
 14 November - Dina Edling, opera singer (died 1935)

Deaths

 13 March - Prince Carl Oscar, Duke of Södermanland, prince (born 1852)
 20 March - Anna Leonore König, singer (born 1771)
 27 May - Stor-Stina, Sami (born 1819) 
 Lisa Erlandsdotter, artist (born 1774)
 Vilhelm Pettersson, ballet dancer (born 1814)

References

 
Years of the 19th century in Sweden
Sweden